The 2020–21 Maine Black Bears Men's ice hockey season was the 46th season of play for the program, the 44th season competing at the Division I level, and the 37th season in the Hockey East conference. The Black Bears represented the University of Maine and played their home games at Alfond Arena, and were coached by Red Gendron, in his 8th season as their head coach.

Season
As a result of the ongoing COVID-19 pandemic the entire college ice hockey season was delayed. Because the NCAA had previously announced that all winter sports athletes would retain whatever eligibility they possessed through at least the following year, none of Maine's players would lose a season of play. However, the NCAA also approved a change in its transfer regulations that would allow players to transfer and play immediately rather than having to sit out a season, as the rules previously required.

Maine played all of its regular season games on the road. Despite there being no crowds in any of the buildings, travelling for all of their games did no favors for the team and Maine won only three of their contests all season. Due to the difficulty of their schedule, Maine was ranked 8th in the Hockey East Power Index and was able to finally play at home in the first round of the Hockey East Tournament. The home site didn't change the team's fortunes, however, and Maine lost 2–7 to New Hampshire, ending their season.

Kevin Hock and Keenan Suthers sat out the season.

Shortly after the end of the season, head coach Red Gendron died following a medical episode while on a golf course. He was 63.

Departures

Recruiting

Roster
As of February 12, 2021.

Standings

Schedule and Results

|-
!colspan=12 style=";" | Regular Season

|-
!colspan=12 style=";" |

Scoring statistics

Goaltending statistics

Rankings

USCHO did not release a poll in week 20.

References

2020-21
2020–21 Hockey East men's ice hockey season
2020–21 NCAA Division I men's ice hockey by team
2020–21 in American ice hockey by team
2021 in sports in Maine
2020 in sports in Maine